A list of Western films released in the 1920s. All films are silent unless otherwise designated as a "talkie".

1920
Western